was a Japanese imperial prince of the early Heian period.

Biography 
He was born in 792 in Kyoto.

In 824, at the beginning of the Tenchō era, he received a pardon and was allowed return to the Capital.

Among his other children was the scholar and poet .

The , an 842 rebellion plot, was uncovered thanks to an anonymous report by Prince Abo. He died in the same year, on the twenty-second day of the tenth month.

Genealogy 
His father was Emperor Heizei and his mother was a court lady Fujii no Fujiko/Tōshi , Fujii no Michiyori's daughter

Wife: Imperial Princess Ito (伊都内親王), eighth daughter of Emperor Kanmu
Third son: Ariwara no Yukihira (在原 行平, 818 –  6 September 893) 
Fifth son: Ariwara no Narihira (在原業平, 825 – 9 July 890)
Unknown concubine
Eldest son: Prince Kanemi (兼見王)
Second son: Ariwara no Nakahira (在原仲平)
Fourth son:  Ariwara no Morihei (在原守平)
Sixth son: Gyokei (行慶)
First daughter: Wife of Minamoto no Hiromu (源弘), son of Emperor Saga
Second daughter: Unknown

Family tree

References

Bibliography

External links 
 Abo-shinnō on Kotobank.

792 births
842 deaths
People from Kyoto
Japanese princes
9th century in Japan
People of Heian-period Japan
Sons of emperors